Néstor Rubén Togneri (27 November 1942 – 8 December 1999) was an Argentine footballer.

He played mostly for Estudiantes de La Plata (1968–1975) as a central defender or defensive midfielder, and was part of the Argentina national football team that took part at the 1974 FIFA World Cup. Togneri also played for Club Atlético Platense between 1957 (when he made his debut in the junior team) and 1967 and for Club Atlético Quilmes in 1976, where he retired from football.

During his time with Estudiantes the club enjoyed the most successful period in their history. Togneri was part of the team that won three Copa Libertadores, one Copa Intercontinental and one Copa Interamericana.

Togneri died in San Martín, Buenos Aires province, at the age of 57.

Honours
 Estudiantes
Primera División Argentina: Metropolitano 1967
Copa Libertadores: 1968, 1969, 1970
Copa Intercontinental: 1968
Copa Interamericana: 1968

References

1942 births
1999 deaths
People from San Martín, Buenos Aires
Argentine footballers
Argentina international footballers
Association football defenders
Association football midfielders
Association football utility players
Argentine Primera División players
Estudiantes de La Plata footballers
Club Atlético Platense footballers
Quilmes Atlético Club footballers
1974 FIFA World Cup players
Independiente Medellín managers
Argentine football managers
Sportspeople from Buenos Aires Province